Alice is an unincorporated community located in Clear Creek County, Colorado, United States.

History
A post office was established at Alice in 1898, and remained in operation until 1938. The community was named after Alice Taylor, the wife of a mine official.

References

Geography of Clear Creek County, Colorado